Axel Larsson (7 August 1885 – 30 June 1961) was a Danish wrestler. He competed in the men's Greco-Roman middleweight at the 1908 Summer Olympics.

References

1885 births
1961 deaths
Danish male sport wrestlers
Olympic wrestlers of Denmark
Wrestlers at the 1908 Summer Olympics
Sportspeople from Copenhagen